Alexander Eliraz (14 October 1914 – 16 January 2004) was an Israeli sports shooter. He competed in two events for Israel at the 1952 Summer Olympics.

References

1914 births
2004 deaths
Israeli male sport shooters
Olympic shooters of Israel
Shooters at the 1952 Summer Olympics
Place of birth missing
Soviet emigrants to Mandatory Palestine